Michael Allen Collins Jr. (born July 2, 1967) is an American politician and businessman serving as the U.S. representative for  since 2023.

Early life and career
Collins graduated from Georgia State University with a bachelor's degree in business. He has operated several businesses, including a trucking company.

U.S. House of Representatives
Collins ran to represent  in the United States House of Representatives in the 2014 elections, when incumbent Paul Broun was not seeking reelection. Collins finished in second place in the primary election to Jody Hice, advancing to a runoff election. Hice defeated Collins in the runoff.

After Hice announced that he would not seek reelection in the 2022 elections, Collins announced his candidacy. Collins and Vernon Jones advanced to a runoff election, and Collins defeated Jones in the runoff on June 21. Collins defeated Tabitha Johnson-Green, the Democratic nominee, in the November 8 general election.

After his election, Collins drew attention for hiring Brandon Phillips as his chief of staff. Phillips was arrested in November 2022 on a misdemeanor charge of animal cruelty for kicking a dog, and had two previous criminal incidents, including pleading guilty to criminal trespassing and battery for a 2008 incident when he attacked a man and slashed his car's tires, and threw a woman's laptop.

Tenure

Syria
In 2023, Collins was among 47 Republicans to vote in favor of H.Con.Res. 21 which directed President Joe Biden to remove U.S. troops from Syria within 180 days.

Personal life
Collins's father, the late Mac Collins, also served in the House of Representatives, representing Georgia's 3rd congressional district.

Collins and his wife, Leigh Ann, have three children.

References

External links
 U.S. House website
 Mike Collins for Congress
 
 

|-

1967 births
21st-century American politicians
American trucking industry businesspeople
Georgia (U.S. state) Republicans
Georgia State University alumni
Living people
Republican Party members of the United States House of Representatives from Georgia (U.S. state)